Ashkara Rural District is a rural district (dehestan) in the Fareghan District of Hajjiabad County, Hormozgan Province, Iran. At the 2006 census, its population was 8,003, in 1,950 families.  The rural district has 16 villages.

References 

Rural Districts of Hormozgan Province
Hajjiabad County